Sybrand van Beest (c.1610 – 1674), was a Dutch Golden Age painter.

Biography
He was born in The Hague and became a pupil of Adriaen van de Venne. He was influenced by Jan van Goyen and is known for landscapes with figures in the manner of Isaac van Ostade.

He died in Amsterdam.

References

 
Sybrand van Beest on Artnet

1610s births
1674 deaths
Dutch Golden Age painters
Dutch male painters
Artists from The Hague